Wilmer Gómez (born 15 May 1951) is an Ecuadorian footballer. He played in one match for the Ecuador national football team in 1975. He was also part of Ecuador's squad for the 1975 Copa América tournament.

References

External links
 

1951 births
Living people
Ecuadorian footballers
Ecuador international footballers
Place of birth missing (living people)
Association football midfielders
C.S. Emelec footballers